The Maryland county executive elections of 2022 were held on November 8, 2022. Democratic and Republican primaries were held on July 19, 2022.

Anne Arundel County, Baltimore County, Frederick County, Harford County, Howard County, Montgomery County, Prince George's County, and Wicomico County elected county executives.

Anne Arundel County 
The incumbent County Executive is Democrat Steuart Pittman, who was elected in 2018 with 52.3 percent of the vote. He is eligible for re-election and is seeking a second term.

Democratic primary

Nominee
 Steuart Pittman, incumbent County Executive

Endorsements

Fundraising

Results

Republican primary

Nominee
 Jessica Haire, Anne Arundel County Councilmember (2018–present)

Eliminated in primary
 Fernando Berra, III
 John J. Grasso, former Anne Arundel County Councilmember (2010–2018)
 Chris Jahn, business consultant
 Herb McMillan, former state delegate for the 30th district (2011–2019)

Declined
 Sid Saab, state delegate for the 33rd district (running for Maryland Senate)

Endorsements

Fundraising

Polling

Results

General election

Endorsements

Fundraising

Polling

Results

Baltimore County 
The incumbent County Executive is Democrat John A. Olszewski Jr., who was elected in 2018 with 57.8 percent of the vote. He is eligible for re-election and is seeking a second term.

Democratic primary

Nominee
 John A. Olszewski Jr., incumbent County Executive

Eliminated in primary
 Adam Reuter

Endorsements

Fundraising

Results

Republican primary

Nominee
 Pat McDonough, former state delegate for the 7th district (2003–2019) and candidate for county executive in 2018

Eliminated in primary
 Darren M. Badillo, community activist
 Henry Ciezkowski
 Thilo August Albert Gluck, owner and president of Phoenix Engineering
 A. Scott Pappas
 Kimberley Stansbury

Endorsements

Fundraising

Results

General election

Endorsements

Fundraising

Results

Frederick County 
Incumbent two-term Democratic County Executive Jan Gardner is term-limited and cannot seek re-election to a third consecutive term.

Democratic primary

Nominee
 Jessica Fitzwater, Frederick County Councilmember (2014–present)

Eliminated in primary
 Daryl A. Boffman, former School Board Member (2002–2010)
 Kai John Hagen, Frederick County Councilmember (2018–present)

Endorsements

Fundraising

Results

Republican primary

Nominee
 Michael Hough, state senator for the 4th district (2015–present)

Endorsements

Fundraising

Results

General election

Endorsements

Fundraising

Results

Harford County 
Incumbent Republican County Executive Barry Glassman is term-limited and is running for Comptroller of Maryland in 2022.

Republican primary

Nominee
 Bob Cassilly, state senator for the 34th district (2015–present)

Eliminated in primary
 Billy Boniface, senior advisor to County Executive Barry Glassman

Endorsements

Fundraising

Results

Democratic primary

Nominee
 Blane H. Miller, III

Fundraising

Results

General election

Endorsements

Fundraising

Results

Howard County 
The incumbent County Executive is Democrat Calvin Ball III, who was elected in 2018 with 52.8 percent of the vote. He is eligible for re-election and is seeking a second term.

Democratic primary

Nominee
 Calvin Ball III, incumbent County Executive

Eliminated in primary
 Harry Dunbar, candidate for county executive in 2018

Endorsements

Fundraising

Results

Republican primary

Nominee
 Allan H. Kittleman, former County Executive (2014–2018)

Eliminated in primary
 Molsen Haghighat
 Darren Vilus

Fundraising

Results

General election

Endorsements

Fundraising

Results

Montgomery County 
The incumbent County Executive is Democrat Marc Elrich, who was elected in 2018 with 64.3 percent of the vote. He is eligible for re-election and is seeking a second term.

Democratic primary

Nominee
 Marc Elrich, incumbent County Executive

Eliminated in primary
 David T. Blair, president of Council for Advocacy and Policy Solutions and candidate for county executive in 2018
 Peter James, tech worker
 Hans Riemer, Montgomery County Councilmember (2010–present)

Endorsements

Fundraising

Polling
Graphical summary

Results

Republican primary

Nominee
 Reardon Sullivan, Montgomery County Republican committee chair

Eliminated in primary
 Shelly Skolnick, perennial candidate

Endorsements

Fundraising

Results

Green convention

Failed to qualify
 Devin Battley, motorcycle racer (not nominated by party)

Fundraising

General election

Endorsements

Fundraising

Results

Prince George's County 
The incumbent County Executive is Democrat Angela Alsobrooks, who was elected in 2018 with 98.9 percent of the vote. She is eligible for re-election and is seeking a second term.

Democratic primary

Nominee 
 Angela Alsobrooks, incumbent County Executive

Eliminated in primary
 Leigh Bodden, former cornerback for the Cleveland Browns, Detroit Lions, and the New England Patriots, and former professional football player
 Billy W. Bridges, candidate for county executive in 2018
 Sherman R. Hardy
 Moisette Tonya Sweat, vice president of the South County Economic Development Association

Endorsements

Fundraising

Results

Independent and third-party candidates

Failed to qualify 
 Joe Njuguna (Independent), Marine Corps veteran

Fundraising

General election

Endorsements

Fundraising

Results

Wicomico County 
Acting County Executive John Psota is seeking his first full term. He was appointed to fill the seat of former County Executive Robert L. Culver, Jr, who died of cancer on July 26, 2020.

Republican primary

Nominee 
 Julie Giordano, middle/high school teacher and member of the Wicomico County Republican Central Committee

Eliminated in primary 
 John Psota, incumbent County Executive

Endorsements

Fundraising

Results

Democratic primary

Nominee 
 Ernest Davis, vice president of the Wicomico County Council (2021–present)

Fundraising

Results

Independent and third-party candidates

Declared 
 Muir Boda (Libertarian), vice president of the Salisbury City Council

Fundraising

General election

Endorsements

Fundraising

Results

Notes

Partisan clients

See also 
United States elections, 2022

References

External links
Official campaign websites for Anne Arundel County executive candidates
 Jessica Haire (R) for County Executive
 Steuart Pittman (D) for County Executive

Official campaign websites for Baltimore County executive candidates
 Johnny Olszewski (D) for County Executive

Official campaign websites for Frederick County executive candidates
 Jessica Fitzwater (D) for County Executive
 Mike Hough (R) for County Executive

Official campaign websites for Harford County executive candidates
 Bob Cassilly (R) for County Executive

Official campaign websites for Howard County executive candidates
 Calvin Ball (D) for County Executive
 Allan Kittleman (R) for County Executive

Official campaign websites for Montgomery County executive candidates
 Marc Elrich (D) for County Executive
 Reardon Sullivan (R) for County Executive

Official campaign websites for Prince George's County executive candidates
 Angela Alsobrooks (D) for County Executive

Official campaign websites for Wicomico County executive candidates
 Muir Boda (L) for County Executive
 Julie Giordano (R) for County Executive

County executives
Maryland county executives